Yukio Mochizuki (born 23 April 1971) is a Japanese biathlete. He competed in the men's sprint event at the 2002 Winter Olympics.

References

1971 births
Living people
Japanese male biathletes
Olympic biathletes of Japan
Biathletes at the 2002 Winter Olympics
Sportspeople from Niigata Prefecture